The Japan Basketball League (JBL) was a professional basketball league in Japan. It made up the top-tier of basketball in Japan alongside the bj league, Japan's other basketball competition, with no promotion and relegation between bj and the JBL.

The JBL was composed of two divisions, the JBL (Division 1, formerly JBL Super League) and the JBL2 (Division 2, formerly Japan League).

In June 2012, the Japan Basketball Association announced the establishment of the National Basketball League (NBL) as the topflight professional league in Japan. The 2012–13 season was the last JBL season as JBL teams joined the NBL.

History 
The Japan Basketball League was formed after the JBL Super League, which was held from 2001 to 2007, was disbanded. The new Japan Basketball League started with the 2007–08 season with 7 teams of the JBL Super League (Aisin SeaHorses, Hitachi SunRockers, Mitsubishi Electric Diamond Dolphins, OSG Phoenix, Panasonic Super Kangaroos, Toshiba Red Thunders, Toyota Alvark), and one team from another league, Rera Kamuy Hokkaido.

List of champions

Award winners

Regular season MVP

Finals MVP

Statistical leaders

Top scorers

Rebounding leaders

Assists leaders

Steals leaders

Blocks leaders

Clubs 

The teams that played in JBL's last season in 2012–13 were:

JBL 
Aisin SeaHorses
Mitsubishi Diamond Dolphins
Levanga Hokkaido
Toyota Alvark
Hitachi SunRockers
Toshiba Brave Thunders
Panasonic Trians
Link Tochigi Brex

JBL2 
Hitachi Cable Bulldogs
Big Blue Tokyo
Kuroda Electric Bullet Spirits
Ishikawa Blue Sparks
Toyota Tsusho Fighting Eagles
Aisin AW Areions Anjo
Toyoda Gosei Scorpions
Renova Kagoshima
TGI D-Rise
Hyogo Storks

References

External links 
 Official JBL website
 Official JBL2 website

2007 establishments in Japan
Basketball leagues in Japan
2013 disestablishments in Japan